Earl Dreeshen  (born July 9, 1953) is a Canadian politician, currently serving as a Member of Parliament with the Conservative Party.

Political career
Dreeshen was initially elected to represent the electoral district of Red Deer in the 2008 Canadian federal election, and re-elected with an increased majority in 2011. Red Deer was split almost in half ahead of the 2015 election, and Dreeshen opted to run in Red Deer—Mountain View—essentially the southern half of his old riding.

Abortion 
Dreeshen is anti-abortion. Dreeshen supported a motion to examine whether a fetus is a human being, which was defeated in the House of Commons in a vote of 203 to 91.

Dreeshen voted in support of Bill C-233 - An Act to amend the Criminal Code (sex-selective abortion), which would restrict abortion access, making it a criminal offence for a medical practitioner to knowingly perform an abortion solely on the grounds of the child's genetic sex.

Conversion therapy 
On June 22, 2021, Dreeshen was one of 63 MPs to vote against Bill C-6, An Act to amend the Criminal Code (conversion therapy), which was passed by majority vote, making certain aspects of conversion therapy a crime, including "causing a child to undergo conversion therapy."

Personal life
Prior to becoming an MP he was a farmer and a physics and math teacher. He and his wife still manage their family farm. His son Devin Dreeshen was MLA for Innisfail-Sylvan Lake and a former Alberta Minister of Agriculture and Forestry.

Electoral record

References

External links
Earl Dreeshen

1953 births
Conservative Party of Canada MPs
Living people
Members of the House of Commons of Canada from Alberta
People from Red Deer, Alberta
21st-century Canadian politicians
Farmers from Alberta
People from Red Deer County